Dating back to 1851, Nykredit is one of Denmark's leading financial services companies with activities ranging from mortgage, retail and investment banking to insurance, leasing and fixed income trading and asset management.

The Nykredit Group is the largest lender in Denmark and one of the major private bond issuers in Europe.

 Group profit before tax: DKK 3,205m (2012) 
 Market share of mortgage banking: 43% (2012) 
 Market share of commercial banking: 5.7% (2012)

In 2003 Nykredit bought Totalkredit, a mortgage lending institution whose products are distributed by 103 regional and local banks.

In 2008 Nykredit bought Forstædernes Bank and merged it with Nykredit Bank.

In 2014 Nykredit lost a principal case at the Danish Supreme Court regarding service fees.

In February 2016 Nykredit faced public outrage among their customers due to significantly increased service fees.

On 9 September 2016 The Danish Consumer-ombudsman filed a police report regarding misleading marketing of service fees conducted by the subsidiary company Totalkredit.

Subsidiaries
Nykredit today has the following wholly owned subsidiaries:
 Totalkredit A/S
 Nykredit Bank A/S
 Nykredit Mægler A/S
 Nykredit Ejendomme A/S

See also

 Nykredit Architecture Prize

References

External links
Nykredit.dk - Official Danish website.
Nykredit.com - Official English website.

Companies based in Copenhagen Municipality
Financial services companies based in Copenhagen
Cooperative banking in Europe
Danish companies established in 1885
Schmidt Hammer Lassen buildings